

W

W